Crysan da Cruz Queiroz Barcelos (born 7 July 1996), simply known as Crysan, is a Brazilian footballer who plays for Chinese Super League club Shandong Taishan as a forward or winger.

Club career
Born in Sud Mennucci, São Paulo, Crysan joined Grêmio Barueri youth setup before joining top tier club Atlético Paranaense's youth setup in February 2013. He would be promoted to their under-23s in January 2015. This would be followed by him being graduating to the senior team and then signing a three-year deal with the club. He would go on to make his debut on 1 February 2015, in a Campeonato Paranaense game against Cascavel that ended in a 0-0 draw. His debut goal would soon follow in the same competition on 5 February 2015 against Rio Branco in a 3-1 defeat. After scoring five goals in Campeonato Paranaense state league, Crysan made his debut for the Série A national league on 19 July 2015, starting in a 1–0 home win against Chapecoense. 

In the following season he would gain his first piece of silverware as part of the team that won the 2016 Campeonato Paranaense state league. To gain more playing time was loaned out to second tier club Oeste where he quickly established himself as an integral member of their team that helped them avoid relegation at the end of the Campeonato Brasileiro Série B league season. Another loan would happen, this time he would be going abroad to Belgian team Cercle Brugge where once again he would be an integral member of their team that went on to win the division and promotion to the top tier at the end of the 2017–18 Belgian First Division B season. On 22 August 2018, Crysan joined Saudi club Al-Batin on loan for an undisclosed fee. After a brief loan to Atlético Goianiense, Crysan would permanently move abroad to top tier Portuguese club C.D. Santa Clara.

On 15 April 2022, Crysan joined top tier Chinese football club Shandong Taishan for the start of the 2022 Chinese Super League campaign. He made his debut for the club on 3 June 2022 in a league game against Zhejiang Professional that ended in a 1-0 victory. This would be followed by his first goal for the club, which was scored in a league game on 28 June 2022 against Henan Songshan Longmen in a 2-0 victory. He would establish himself as a regular member of the teams attack that went on to the win the 2022 Chinese FA Cup with them.

Career statistics
.

Honours

Club
Athletico Paranaense
Campeonato Paranaense: 2016

Cercle Brugge
Challenger Pro League: 2017–18

Shandong Taishan
Chinese FA Cup: 2022.

References

External links
Atlético Paranaense profile 

1996 births
Living people
Footballers from São Paulo (state)
Brazilian footballers
Association football wingers
Campeonato Brasileiro Série A players
Campeonato Brasileiro Série B players
Saudi Professional League players
Challenger Pro League players
Primeira Liga players
Chinese Super League players
Club Athletico Paranaense players
Oeste Futebol Clube players
Cercle Brugge K.S.V. players
Al Batin FC players
Atlético Clube Goianiense players
C.D. Santa Clara players
Shandong Taishan F.C. players
Expatriate footballers in Belgium
Expatriate footballers in Saudi Arabia
Expatriate footballers in Portugal
Expatriate footballers in China
Brazilian expatriate sportspeople in Saudi Arabia
Brazilian expatriate sportspeople in Belgium
Brazilian expatriate sportspeople in Portugal
Brazilian expatriate sportspeople in China